The 1973 British League Division Two season was the second tier of motorcycle speedway in Great Britain.

Summary
The 1973 season saw the league expanded to 18 teams with the addition of Chesterton Potters. The team had last raced during the 1963 Provincial Speedway League season under the name of the Stoke Potters.

Boston Barracudas won their first title and went on to win the league and cup double. Boston had finished runner-up to Crewe Kings the previous season, with decent season averages recorded by five riders Arthur Price, Jim Ryman, Carl Glover, Russ Osborne and Ray Bales. With a largely unchanged team, they went one place better by sealing the league title. Boston won easily, 14 points clear of their nearest rival, and four of the five riders improved their averages from 1972. Arthur Price also won the Riders' Championship.

Final table

British League Division Two Knockout Cup
The 1973 British League Division Two Knockout Cup was the sixth edition of the Knockout Cup for tier two teams. Boston Barracudas were the winners of the competition.

First round

Second round

Quarter-finals

Semi-finals

Final
First leg

Second leg

Boston were declared Knockout Cup Champions, winning on aggregate 89–66.

Leading final averages

Riders & final averages
Barrow

Tom Owen 8.32
Mike Sampson 8.31
Terry Kelly 7.40
Sid Sheldrick 6.98
Chris Bailey 6.97
Craig Pendlebury 6.50
Joe Owen 6.21
Chris Roynon 5.69
Keith Evans 5.60

Berwick

Doug Templeton 8.12 
Willie Templeton 7.38
Andy Meldrum 7.09
Graham Jones 4.81
Chris Quigley 4.55
Denny Morter 4.17
Ettienne Olivier 4.15
Rob Hollingworth 4.00
Geoff Davies 2.98
Dennis Jackson 2.14

Birmingham

Arthur Browning 8.85
Ted Howgego 8.62
George Major 8.29
John Hart 8.29
Phil Herne 7.59
Mike Lanham 7.23
Malcolm Corradine 7.21
Steve Wilson 5.78
Terry Shearer 5.26
Alan Grahame 3.29

Boston

Carl Glover 9.62 
Arthur Price 9.14
Jim Ryman 8.42
Russ Osborne 7.85
Dave Piddock 7.81
Ray Bales 7.28
David Gagen 6.94
Tony Featherstone 6.88
Les Glover 3.40

Bradford

Alan Knapkin 10.03
Dave Baugh 9.23
Robin Adlington 7.93
Tony Featherstone 7.74
Brenton Langlois 5.71
Mick Fairbairn 5.65
Colin Meredith 5.37
Mike Fullerton 4.75
Tony Freegard 4.67
Rob Maxfield 4.40
Rod Chessell 3.45

Canterbury

Barney Kennett 7.38
Peter Murray 6.90
Ted Hubbard 6.75
Derek Cook 6.41
Trevor Jones 6.33
Graham Banks 5.96
Dave Piddock 5.71
Les Rumsey 5.71
Gary Cottham Sr. 4.61
Dave Gooderham 4.30

Chesterton

Mike Broadbank 9.24
Mick Handley 6.70
Geoff Pusey 6.20
Alan Bridgett 5.90
Roger Parker 5.70
Brian Woodward 5.52
Cyril Francis 5.11
Martin Yeates 4.76
Nigel Wasley 4.15

Crewe

John Jackson 8.55
Geoff Ambrose 8.50
Dave Morton 8.44
Wayne Forrest 5.44
Glyn Taylor 5.29
Ian Cartwright 4.88
Keith White 4.68
Peter Thompson 3.78
Cliff Anderson 3.26 

Eastbourne

Bobby McNeil 9.34
Roger Johns 8.59
Paul Gachet 7.32
Trevor Geer 6.26
Mike Vernam .5.62
Neil Middleditch 4.82
Eric Dugard 4.54
Jimmy Squibb 4.17

Ellesmere Port

Graham Drury 9.03
Paul O'Neal 7.94
Robbie Gardner 6.99
Colin Goad 6.51
Chris Morton 6.29
Barry Booth 4.35
Gerald Smitherman 4.24
Roger Austin 4.14
Wayne Hughes 3.40
Paul Callaghan 2.29

Hull

Dave Mills 9.29
Tony Childs 8.49
Alan Cowland 7.66
Robin Amundson 7.60
Dennis Gavros 5.55
Pete Boston 4.58
Dennis Wasden 4.42
Kelvin Mullarkey 4.31
Clark Facey 4.00
Grahame Dawson 3.17
Roger Austin 2.80
Eddie Argall 1.94

Long Eaton

Roger Mills 8.28
Geoff Bouchard 8.20 
Norman Strachan 7.41
Phil Bass 6.93
Dave Harvey 6.18
Alan Molyneux 5.55
Alan Witt 5.55 
Joe Hughes 4.51
Steve Bass 4.00
Mick Moore 3.65
Ian Teale 2.48

Peterborough

Richard Greer 8.96 
John Davis 8.86
Frank Smith 7.31
Brian Clark 7.27
Ted Howgego 6.40
Roy Carter 6.07
Jack Walker 5.72
Roy Sizmore 4.00
Ken Matthews 2.63

Rayleigh

Peter Moore 8.30
Bob Young 7.04
Trevor Barnwell 6.59
Dave "Tiger" Beech 6.12
Les Ott 5.87
Brian Foote 5.75
Terry Stone 5.27
Peter Cairns 4.96
Pete Wigley 4.56
Dingle Brown 4.29
Steve Clarke 3.58

Scunthorpe

Ken McKinlay 9.69
Ian Hindle 8.18
Dingle Brown 6.18
Rod Haynes 5.87
Jack Bywater 5.40
Doug Underwood 4.64
Rex Garrod 4.58
Chris Emery 3.30

Sunderland

Jack Millen 9.74 
Dave Gatenby 7.56 
Jim Wells 7.44
Russ Dent 6.21
George Barclay 6.10
Terry Barclay 4.66
Brian Havelock 4.64
Peter Wrathall 4.07
John Robson 1.14

Teesside
 
Bruce Forrester 9.15 
Frank Auffret 8.61 
Roger Wright 7.47
Pete Reading 6.85
Dave Durham 6.35
Tim Swales 6.12
Russ Hodgson 5.38
Tom Black 4.95
Mick Moore 4.00

Workington

Lou Sansom 10.50
Malcolm MacKay 8.88
Mitch Graham 8.07 
Taffy Owen 7.44
Kym Amundson 5.51
Steve Watson 5.41
Bernie Hornby 3.57
Darryl Stobbart 3.53

See also
List of United Kingdom Speedway League Champions
Knockout Cup (speedway)

References

Speedway British League Division Two / National League